There have been at least three Ships bearing the name), operated by the  (Social Institute of the Navy) on behalf of the Spanish Ministry of Employment and Social Security serving as hospital ships for Spanish fishermen.

 Esperanza del Mar - former , sunk as an artificial reef in 2000.
 Esperanza del Mar - former container freighter, build in 1977, converted to Hospital Ship in 1982
 Esperanza del Mar - purpose-build vessel, commissioned in 2001

2001 Vessel

Costing over €21 million, with around 20 percent being funded by subsidies from the European Union, the ship was built by Juliana Constructora Gijonesa S.A., in Gijon, Spain. Commissioned in October, it entered regular service in late November 2001. Homeported in Las Palmas, Esperanza del Mar provides medical services for the crews of the Spanish industrial fishing fleet off the coast of Western Africa.  It is one of the larger hospital ships currently in service and possibly the largest purpose-built hospital ship (instead of converted vessels).

References

External links
 Esperanza del mar Pictures of the Ship
 Medical Service Ensign (Spain)

Hospital ships
2001 ships